Komuna may refer to:

 Komuna or komunë ("commune"), a former Albanian administrative division
 Komuna (journal), a Czech anarchist journal in the early 20th century
 Komuna (company), a Serbian record label and media production company established in 1985 and headquartered in Belgrade